Colitas (little tails) may refer to:
 A slang term in Hispanic culture for the buttocks
 A slang term in Mexico for the buds of the cannabis plant

See also
 Colita (Isabel Steva i Hernández), Spanish photographer